Ferrimonas senticii is a bacterium from the genus of Ferrimonas which has been isolated from slime of the fish Arothron hispidus from the Kaneohe Bay in the United States.

References

Bacteria described in 2007
Alteromonadales